Denis Kudla was the defending champion, but chose not to compete.
James Ward defeated James Duckworth in the final.

Seeds

Draw

Finals

Top half

Bottom half

References
Main Draw
Qualifying Draw

2013 MS
2013 ATP Challenger Tour